Colonel Bleep is a 1957 American animated TV series, which was the first color cartoon series made for television. It was created and written by Robert D. Buchanan and Jack Schleh in June 8, 1956, and was animated by Soundac, Inc. of Miami. The show was originally syndicated in September 21, 1957 as a segment on Uncle Bill's TV Club. One hundred episodes, of varying length of between three and six minutes each, were produced.  Of these episodes, 44 episodes are known to exist in some form, eight of which are only available in monochrome.

Summary

In 1945, the first nuclear explosion on Earth has cosmic effects: Scratch, a hibernating Stone Age caveman, is awakened/transported to the present by the blast; and the denizens of the possible exoplanet Futura become alarmed. The Futurians, an alien race with heads shaped like Reuleaux triangles and small, slender bodies, send one of their own, Colonel Bleep, to investigate. Upon reaching Earth, Bleep commissions Scratch as a deputy, with Bleep representing the future and Scratch the past. Representing the present day is Squeak, a cowboy hat-wearing puppet ("a happy-go-lucky boy...very much like you") and former actor that can move on his own volition but cannot speak (as a puppet, he cannot speak on his own; this concept was eventually abandoned, and Squeak occasionally spoke in some of the later episodes). Together, the three establish a base at Zero Zero Island in the Atlantic Ocean to protect Earth's Solar System from extraterrestrial threats.

Colonel Bleep was typically seen with a transparent bubble as a helmet, with a helicopter-like propeller and two antennae. The propeller, used in conjunction with Bleep's ever-present unicycle, helped propel the creature through space. The antennae shot beams of "futomic energy" (a portmanteau of future and atomic), which could manifest itself in any number of ways, most commonly as a raygun.  The amount of futomic energy Colonel Bleep could absorb at any given time was finite, and in a few episodes he runs out of energy and becomes vulnerable; there were also situations where the heat that the futomic beam generated would pose a hazard and make it an unsuitable choice. His helicopter could also be pressed into service as a drill or auger. Scratch's main weapons were his superhuman strength and a large club. Squeak, other than his unexplained sentience and ability to move on his own, had no identifiable superpowers.

The series drew heavy influence from the Space Age of its time. Occasionally, the planet Futura and its denizens would be seen; most of the series took place within Earth's Solar System, with intelligent life forms existing on most planets. Interplanetary travel was facilitated by robots, and a space station, X-1, served as a transportation hub. The accuracy of the science varied widely from episode to episode.

Episodes could follow any number of formats. Training episodes would often follow a format of binary oppositions in which the savvy learner Scratch would follow Bleep's instructions while the hotshot Squeak blew off his duties and got himself into trouble. Travelogues featured the trio visiting areas such as the Belgian Congo or New Orleans, with no substantial conflict. Most commonly, the trio would be pit against intergalactic villains, some of whom were recurring: the hooded archvillain Dr. Destructo, who escaped from the rings of Saturn early in the series; Bruto the Black Robot, Dr. Destructo's former henchman; Black Patch, a space pirate; and the Black Knight of Pluto.

Production

Colonel Bleep was produced by Soundac, Inc. Soundac was originally formed in 1951 in Buffalo, New York by Bobby Nicholson. After Nicholson left, Robert D. Buchanan took his place. In 1955, Soundac relocated to Miami, Florida.

A collection of wraparounds for a hosted show illustrated the initial concept of Colonel Bleep: the animated shorts would serve as the framework for a full-service children's variety show, complete with quizzes, riddles and interactive content. It may have had a public airing on Colonel Bleep's Buffalo affiliate, WGR-TV (channel 2).

The show was syndicated by Richard H. Ullman in Buffalo, and the wraparound segment reel was sponsored by the Canadian grocery store chain Loblaws, which had locations in the Buffalo area at the time.

The show's working title was The Adventures of Colonel Bleep. The animation in the show was extraordinarily limited animation, as was typical of TV animation during that era. Local newscaster Noah Tyler was the narrator for the show and provided virtually all of the vocal characterizations (most of the characters were mute). Jack Schleh directed all of the episodes.  The design of the series was greatly influenced by the futuristic googie designs of the 1950s and early 1960s: space vehicles included angular designs and large tailfins, boomerangs were frequently incorporated into signs, architecture and some vehicles, and stereotypical atomic symbols were used frequently, particularly to represent Bleep's futomic energy.

Schleh and Buchanan also produced a series of syndicated physical fitness cartoons for children through Soundac called The Mighty Mister Titan. The series premiered on January 1, 1964, with 100 episodes airing.   Although Colonel Bleep is generally well-regarded today, The Mighty Mister Titan is not.

Legacy
Unlike contemporary animated television shorts of the era, which were mostly preserved, practically no original material from the production of Colonel Bleep is known to exist today.  In the early 1970s, while Jack Schleh was closing Soundac and moving the company's materials to a van, car thieves stole the van. Its contents have never turned up.

Colonel Bleep has probably not been shown on television in the United States since Soundac's closure (and the aforementioned theft of the master films). The show aired as late as 1971. The copyrights of the show's episodes lapsed, without being renewed, in 1985. Two videocassettes from the series were released by Streamline Pictures in 1991, containing most episodes still known to exist at the time (reportedly discovered in the film storage vault of a southwestern U.S. TV station which had formerly aired the show). Apart from "The Treacherous Pirate", no more episodes were released until August 23, 2005, when Alpha Video released a DVD entitled Colonel Bleep Volume 1. The DVD contains 23 episodes, about 20 of which do not appear on earlier video releases. Among the known episodes are the series premiere ("Col. Bleep's Arrival on Earth") and a clip show believed to be the series finale ("Test of Friendship").

Eight previously lost episodes were uploaded to YouTube on September 12, 2019, procured from sepia-toned black-and-white prints. A ninth lost episode ("Winner Take All") was also discovered and uploaded to YouTube on October 19, 2019; all nine of the rediscovered episodes were in the personal archives of Ron Kurer and his website Toon Tracker. In September 2018, animation historian Jerry Beck located black-and-white wraparounds, including the show's original title sequence, in the archives of Mark Kausler, and posted the film on YouTube. In October 2019, YouTube user D Fan (Los Angeles radio personality Jhani Kaye) uploaded a kinescope of an episode of the Local children's show Cartoon Express with Engineer Bill which included a title card for the lost episode Squeak and the Black Knight; Kaye had previously included the Colonel Bleep snippet in a 2017 video posted on a previous account.

One episode, "The Treacherous Pirate", can be seen as part of The Speed Racer Show, an anthology film released by Streamline Pictures in 1993; it was released on VHS, LaserDisc and DVD by Family Home Entertainment as Speed Racer: the Movie. The episode occurs between Speed Racer episodes ("The Car Hater" and "Race Against the Mammoth Car, Part 1"). Production notes for The Ren & Stimpy Show cite Colonel Bleep as an inspiration to the show's animators, and the episode "Space Madness" includes a recreation of Colonel Bleep's title sequence.

See also
 List of animated television series of the 1940s and 1950s

References

External links

 
 Colonel Bleep episodes at the Internet Archive

1957 American television series debuts
1950s American animated television series
1960 American television series endings
1960s American animated television series
1950s American science fiction television series
1960s American science fiction television series
American children's animated science fiction television series
American children's animated space adventure television series
First-run syndicated television programs in the United States
Television series about cavemen
Animated television series about extraterrestrial life
Television shows set on islands
Sentient toys in fiction